Elizabeth de Vermandois may refer to:

 Elizabeth of Vermandois, Countess of Leicester (1081–1131), daughter of Hugh of Vermandois; granddaughter of Henry I of France; wife of Robert de Beaumont, 1st Earl of Leicester
 Elisabeth, Countess of Vermandois (1143–1183), daughter of Raoul I of Vermandois and wife of Philip, Count of Flanders